Forbidden Kingdoms is a Pulp magazine-inspired setting for Dungeons & Dragons and d20 Modern, written by R. Hyrum Savage and Dave Webb, and published by OtherWorld Creations.  

Forbidden Kingdoms is set on an alternate history Earth, between the years 1889 and 1939.  The setting includes rules for magic, psionics and martial arts, as well as weird science.

References
 (originally appeared in d20 Weekly)
Savage, R.H. & Webb, D. Forbidden Kingdoms (OtherWorld Creations, 2001).
Webb, D. & Savage, R.H. Paris: The Spectral City (OtherWorld Creations, 2003).
Savage, R.H. & Webb, D. Forbidden Kingdoms: Modern (OtherWorld Creations, 2006).
RPGnet review

External links
Forbidden Kingdoms website

D20 System
Fantasy role-playing games
Historical role-playing games
Science fantasy role-playing games